The Repository Open Service Interface Definition (OSID)  is an Open Knowledge Initiative specification which defines the storing and retrieving of digital content, referred to as assets. OSIDs are programmatic interfaces which comprise a service-oriented architecture for designing and building reusable and interoperable software.

Assets may contain metadata and reside in repositories which support one or more asset types. Examples of assets are documents, course materials, assessment items, images, video, etc.

Multiple repositories can be managed or searched through the use of OSID adapter patterns where underneath a single Repository OSID can exist multiple Repository OSIDs forming a federation of repositories, where each implementation may be using a distinct incompatible technology and the OSID  integrates them.

Demonstrations
SearchParty and OSIDs
VUE and OSIDs
Sakai and OSIDs

References
Kahn, J. A Developer's Guide to the Repository Open Service Interface Definition. 2005.
Kahn, J. Overview of O.K.I. for Repository-Related Applications. 2005.
Kahn, J. The Repository OSID and SRW. 2005.
Kahn, J. O.K.I. Case Studies: Federated Searching. 2005.

Software_architecture